The 2008 Derby City Council election took place on 1 May 2008 to elect members of Derby City Council in England. One third of the council was up for election and the council stayed under no overall control. Overall turnout was 34.6%.

After the election, the composition of the council was:
Liberal Democrat 18
Labour 17
Conservative 14
Independent 2

Campaign
Since the 2006 election the Labour Party had been running the council in an agreement with the Conservatives and both parties did not rule out continuing this arrangement after the election. However, a major issue in the election was a proposal by the Labour party to close 10 play areas across Derby in order to save money, which were opposed by the Conservatives. The arrangement was also strained by the defection of 2 Labour councillors, Hardial Dhamrait and Amar Nath, to the Conservatives since the 2007 election. Other changes since 2007 included Labour councillor Prem Chera becoming an independent, and independent Frank Leeming joining the Conservatives. This meant that before the election there were 21 Labour, 14 Conservative, 13 Liberal Democrat and 2 independent councillors.

In all 61 candidates stood in the election, with 17 seats being contested. Of those 17 seats Labour were defending 8, the Conservatives 6 and the Liberal Democrats 3.

The leader of the Conservative party, David Cameron, visited Derby to support the local party on 3 April and described it as a "key battleground".

Election result
The Liberal Democrats gained 5 seats to move from third largest group on the council to become the largest party, overtaking the Labour and Conservative parties. Liberal Democrat gains were recorded in Abbey, Arboretum and Mackworth wards from Labour, and in Blagreaves and Oakwood wards from the Conservatives. Meanwhile, Labour recovered a seat in Sinfin which they had lost when Hardial Dhamrait had defected to the Conservatives. However, Labour also two seats in Chaddesden and Chellaston to the Conservatives.

Following the elections the three parties held discussions to decide who would run the council for the next two years. On 6 May the Conservatives decided that they would not agree any deal with the other two parties and would sit in opposition, with Conservative councillors feeling that the previous agreement with Labour had meant they did not make gains as the party had done nationally. The Liberal Democrats and Labour then planned to hold talks, with Labour abandoning their previous proposals to introduce congestion charging in Derby, and parking meters in Littleover. However, the Liberal Democrats decided they would prefer to run the council as a minority rather than reach an agreement with Labour. At the council meeting on 21 May the Liberal Democrat leader, Hilary Jones, was elected leader of the council by 19 votes to 17 after the Conservatives abstained.

Ward results

Abbey

Allestree

Alvaston

Arboretum

Blagreaves

Boulton

Chaddesden

Chellaston

Darley

Derwent

Littleover

Mackworth

Mickleover

Normanton

Oakwood

Sinfin

Spondon

References

2008 English local elections
2008
2000s in Derby